Hermann Kuno Julius Kranold (also Hermann Kranold-Steinhaus; 1888, Hannover – 1942, Talladega, Alabama) was a German political writer active in the Social Democratic Party of Germany (SPD).

In the German Revolution
Following the German Revolution, Kranold worked with Otto Neurath and Wolfgang Schumann on the Programm Kranold-Neurath-Schumann in Saxony. All three subsequently went to Bavaria, where Neurath was appointed President of the Central Economic Administration for the Bavarian Soviet Republic.

During the Weimar Republic
Kranold was elected to the Silesian provincial parliament to represent Sprottau District from 1925-32.

Exile in the United States
In 1933, he was arrested on the day of the Reichstag fire. However, his uncle, Max Planck, was able to arrange his release and exile. After a short period in London, he found a job at Talladega College, Alabama. He received financial help from the American Friends Service Committee for the travel costs for him and his family who arrived in the US in 1936. Here, he did work on the economic situation of African Americans in Alabama and elsewhere.

Family life
He married "Red Sophie" Steinhaus, an art historian and revolutionary. They had three children, Candida ("Candy"), Peter, and Johanna Kranold who were born in Sprottau, Silesia. Both Hermann and his wife died of heart disease in 1942.

Works
  Wirtschaftsgeographische Grundlagen zur Weltpolitik  Augsburg: Augsburger Buchdr. u. Verlagsanst.  1916
 Zollunion und Agrarpolitik : die Wirkung einer Vereinigung des deutschen Zollgebietes mit Südosteuropa auf die deutsche Landwirtschaft, Dresden: "Globus", Wiss. Verlagsanstalt, 1917
 "Zum Geburtenrückgang", in Deutsche Wille des Kunstwarts, April 1918, Munich:Callwey pp 35–40
 "Karl Marx", in Deutsche Wille des Kunstwarts, April 1918, Munich:Callwey pp 60–62
 Streitschrift zur Frage der Sozialisierung , Chemnitz: 1919
 "Das deutsche Militärsystem im Weltkrieg", "Abschied von der deutschen Nationalversammlung" in Sozialistische Monatshefte Year 26 volume 54 1920 I
 "Zur Leistung des deutschen Militärsystems", "Zur Produktivität der Landwirtschaft", "Zu den Preussischen Landtagswahlen 1921" in Sozialistische Monatshefte Year 26 volume 55 1920 II
 Bekanntschaft mit dem Sozialismus. Eine Einführung für Jugendliche und Erwachsene, Verlag: Görlitz 1928
 Genossenschaften im neuen Italien, Leipzig: Buske Verlag, 1935 (with Karl Walter)

References

1888 births
1942 deaths
20th-century German male writers
German political writers
German social democrats
German emigrants to the United States